The following is a list of PC games that have been deemed monetarily free by their creator or by the closure of the IP holder and subsequent 'abandonment' (see abandonware). This includes free-to-play games, even if they include monetized micro transactions.

List 

The following list has 27 segments in total, ranging from A to Z, followed by a numerical section.

A

B

C

D

E

F

G

H

I

J

K

L

M

N

O

P

Q

R

S

T

U

V

W

X

Y

Z

Numerical

See also 
 List of open-source video games
 List of commercial video games with available source code
 List of PC games
 List of freeware
 Lists of video games

References 

Free